Ladies' Night may refer to:

 Ladies' night, a type of promotional event

Film and television 
 Ladies' Night (film), a 2003 Mexican romantic comedy
 Ladies Night (1983 film), a film starring Stella Stevens
 Ladies Night (1995 film), a film featuring Stephen Hunter
 "Ladies' Night" (The Cleveland Show), an episode of The Cleveland Show
 "Ladies' Night" (Degrassi: The Next Generation), an episode of Degrassi: The Next Generation
Ladies Night, a 2019 reality television series on BET
 Ladies Night (talk show), a 2019 Dutch talk show on Net5

Music 
 Ladies' Night (album), a 1979 album by Kool & the Gang
 "Ladies' Night" (song), the title song
 Ladies Night (Atomic Kitten album), 2003
 Ladies Night (Preston Reed album), 2004
 "Ladies Night", a 2006 song by Ayumi Hamasaki from (Miss)understood
 "Ladies Night", a 2006 song by Nina Sky from La Conexion
 "Not Tonight", remixed as "Ladies' Night", a 1997 song by Lil' Kim

Other media 
 Ladies' Night (novel), a 2000 novel by Jack Ketchum
 Ladies' Night (play), a 1920 Broadway play by Charlton Andrews and Avery Hopwood
 Ladies Night (play), a 1987 New Zealand play by Stephen Sinclair and Anthony McCarten